Shatter belt is a concept in geopolitics referring to strategically-positioned and -oriented regions on a political map that are deeply internally divided and encompassed in the competition between the great powers in geostrategic areas and spheres.

Definitions
The conceptual foundation of the shatterbelts in the geopolitics stems from the analytical approach of examining the world map of states and empires in terms of their geopolitical struggle, military and political relations seen in relation to those strategically positioned areas that are characterized by a greater inclination of internal division from which they arise conflicts and at the same time are strategically important for the great powers. Linking the term fragility ("on glass") is an obvious result of long-standing clashes with a great deal of disruptive influence, light chaos and, in general, a propensity for devastating conflicts in these regions. Hence, the term "shatter belt" itself is generally referring to a geographical region that is endangered by local conflicts within the states or between countries in the region, as well as the involvement of the opposing great powers outside the region. The concept of the shatter belt - a fragment of fragility in geopolitics is still defined as strategically positioned and oriented regions that are both deeply internally divided and captured in the competition between the great powers in the geostrategic areas and spheres. Regions marked as a fragile belt are often blamed for a large scale of interstate war / conflict, especially in relation to major power conflicts. Regarding their engagement and close connection with major and global conflicts of power, the regions considered as shatter belts are at the same time the main crisis hot spots or hard-to-reach areas in world politics and international relations. Therefore, both the analogy and the comparison to geology where active Shatter belts i.e. faults in geology scattered zones are common places of earthquake occurrence. Therefore, unlike most geopolitical regions that have a different degree of cohesion, the regions that are considered as fragile bands are global destabilizers. Throughout the twentieth century the Balkans were in this position. Today the Caucasus region would fit the definition.

References

Geopolitics
Belt regions